Cleft Falls is a cascade located in Garnet Canyon, Grand Teton National Park in the U.S. state of Wyoming.

References 

Waterfalls of Wyoming
Waterfalls of Grand Teton National Park